The invariant speed or observer invariant speed is a speed which is measured to be the same in all reference frames by all observers.  The invariance of the speed of light is one of the postulates of special relativity, and the terms speed of light and invariant speed are often considered synonymous.  In non-relativistic classical mechanics, or Newtonian mechanics, finite invariant speed does not exist (the only invariant speed predicted by Newtonian mechanics is infinity).

See also 
Variable speed of light
Red Queen's race
Minkowski diagram
Speed of gravity

References 

Theory of relativity